Bauchi State International Airport  is a new airport serving the city of Bauchi, the capital of Bauchi State, Nigeria. It is named after Sir Abubakar Tafawa Balewa, who was Prime Minister of Nigeria from 1957 to 1966.

The airport was constructed in 18 months to replace the in-town Bauchi Airport, and has scheduled airline service. A cargo terminal is also planned.

The BU non-directional beacon (Ident: BU) and Bauchi VOR-DME (Ident: BCH) are located on the field.

Airlines and destinations

See also
Transport in Nigeria
List of airports in Nigeria

References

External links
OpenStreetMap - Bauchi State

Airports in Nigeria